During the 1998–99 English football season, Bristol City F.C. competed in the Football League First Division.

Season summary
The Robins struggled back in Division One, and manager John Ward stepped down in October 1998 after chairman Davidson appointed Benny Lennartsson as coach for rest of the season which infuriated the supporters. They were relegated by finishing bottom of the league which saw Lennartsson sacked and was replaced by Gillingham's Tony Pulis.

Final league table

Results
Bristol City's score comes first

Legend

Football League First Division

FA Cup

League Cup

Squad

References

Bristol City F.C. seasons
Bristol City